The Toxic Avenger is an upcoming American black comedy superhero film written and directed by Macon Blair. The film serves as a reboot and "contemporary reimagining" of the 1984 film of the same name, and the fifth installment overall in The Toxic Avenger film series, and is produced by Lloyd Kaufman and Michael Herz, who also produced the previous films in the franchise. It stars Peter Dinklage as the title character, alongside Jacob Tremblay, Taylour Paige, Kevin Bacon, Julia Davis, and Elijah Wood.

Premise
"Set in a fantasy world following Winston, a stereotypical weakling who works as a janitor at Garb-X health club and is diagnosed with a terminal illness that can only be cured by an expensive treatment that his greedy, power hungry employer refuses to pay for. After deciding to take matters into his own hands and rob his company, Winston falls into a pit of toxic waste and is transformed into a deformed monster that sets out to do good and get back at all the people who have wronged him."

Cast
 Peter Dinklage as Winston / The Toxic Avenger
 Jacob Tremblay as Winston's son
 Taylour Paige as J.J. Doherty
 Kevin Bacon
 Julia Davis as Kissy Sturnevan
 Elijah Wood
 David Yow as Guthrie Stockins
 Macon Blair as Dennis

Production

Development
On April 6, 2010, a remake of The Toxic Avenger (1984) was announced. The remake, said to be aiming for a "family-friendly" PG-13 release similar to the animated Toxic Crusaders television series, was set to be co-written and directed by Steve Pink.

On September 12, 2016, Variety reported that Conrad Vernon will direct the film, with Guillermo del Toro of Double Dare You, Bob Cooper and Alex Schwartz of Storyscape Entertainment, and Akiva Goldsman and Greg Lessans of Weed Road Pictures executive producing, while Mike Arnold and Chris Poole we attached to rewrite the screenplay by Pink and Daniel C. Mitchell.

On December 10, 2018, it was announced that Legendary Pictures has won the rights to reboot The Toxic Avenger, with the original's producers, Lloyd Kaufman and Michael Herz of Troma Entertainment, to serve as producers. On March 21 2019, Macon Blair was announced to write and direct the upcoming film. During an interview with on January 11, 2021, Kaufman praised Blair and his script saying:

Casting
On May 13, 2013, Arnold Schwarzenegger was in talks for a role in the film. He eventually dropped out to work on Terminator Genisys (2015). On November 30, 2020, it was announced that Peter Dinklage would star in the film. In April 14, 2021, Jacob Tremblay and Taylour Paige were added to the cast. In June 11, 2021, Kevin Bacon, Julia Davis, and Elijah Wood joined the cast.

Filming
Principal production commenced on June 21, 2021 in Bulgaria and wrapped on August 14, 2021.

Post-production
On December 23, 2021, Dinklage stated the film is "not a remake". On January 30, 2022, Blair confirmed the film will employ practical gore effects, and the time period setting will be a "little bit of both" in the past and present.

References

External links
 

2020s action films
2020s comedy horror films
2020s English-language films
2020s superhero films
The Toxic Avenger (franchise)
Legendary Pictures films
Upcoming films
American action comedy films
American black comedy films
American comedy horror films
Troma Entertainment films
Films shot in Bulgaria
Superhero horror films
Superhero comedy films
American films about revenge
American vigilante films
American parody films
American superhero films
American science fiction action films
American science fiction horror films
American science fiction comedy films
2020s American films